(Pedro Ascarateil Laxalt) 

Born May 5th 1900 - St Jean-de- Luz (France)

Died August 31st 1963 - Buenos Aires (Argentina)
Pedro Laxalt was an Argentine actor. He starred in the 1950 film Campeón a la fuerza.

Selected filmography
 Sombras Portenas (1936)
 The Boys Didn't Wear Hair Gel Before (1937)
 Fuera de la Ley (1937)
 Nobleza Gaucha (1937)
 Los Locos del Cuarto Piso (1937)
 Los Apuros de Claudina (1938)
 Divorcio en Montevideo (1939)
 Se Abre el Abismo (1944)
 All en el Setenta y Tantos.. (1945
 El jugador (1947)
 Angeles de Uniforme (inedita) (1949)
 Su Ultima Pelea (1949)
 Campeon a la Fuerza (1950)
 Hombres a Precio (1950)
 El Cielo en las Manos (1950)
 Las Aguas Bajan Turbias (1952)
 Marido de Ocasion (1952)
 El Hijo del Crack (1953)
 El UItimo Cowboy (1954)
 Caidos del Infierno (1954)
 La Tierra del Fuego se Apaga (1955)
 Marianela (1955)
Beyond Oblivion (1956) - Mas Alla del Olvido
 Despues del Silencio (1956)
 La Sombra de Safo (1957)
 Spring of Life (1957)
 Una Cita con la Vida (1958)
 Zafra (1959)
 Simiente Humana (1959)
 India (1960)
 Quinto Ano Nacional (1961)
 El Bruto (1962)
 Detras de la Mentira (1962)
 Pelota de Cuero - Detras de una Pasion (1963)
 La Terraza (1963)
 Lujuria Tropical (1964)

References

External links
 
 

Argentine male film actors
Year of birth missing
Year of death missing